The 2014 Gemdale ATP Challenger was a professional tennis tournament played on hard courts. It was the first edition of the tournament which was part of the 2014 ATP Challenger Tour. It took place in Shenzhen, China between 21 and 27 April 2014.

Singles main draw entrants

Seeds

Other entrants
The following players received wildcards into the singles main draw:
  Gong Maoxin
  Wang Chuhan
  Gao Xin
  Ouyang Bowen

The following players received entry from the qualifying draw:
  Jason Jung
  Shuichi Sekiguchi 
  Dominik Meffert
  Nikola Mektić

Doubles main draw entrants

Seeds

Other entrants
The following pairs received wildcards into the doubles main draw:
  Daniel Cox /  Wu Di
  Gong Maoxin /  Zhang Ze
  Liu Xiyu /  Wang Chuhan

The following pair received entry from the qualifying draw:
  Lee Hsin-han /  Matt Reid

Champions

Singles

 Gilles Müller def.  Lukáš Lacko, 7–6(7–4), 6–3

Doubles

  Samuel Groth /  Chris Guccione def.  Dominik Meffert /  Tim Puetz, 6–3, 7–6(7–5)

External links

Gemdale ATP Challenger
Gemdale ATP Challenger
Pingshan Open